Dagur Benediktsson (born 17 June 1998) is an Icelandic cross-country skier. He competed in the FIS Nordic World Ski Championships 2019.

Personal life
Dagur was born in Ísafjörður on the Icelandic National Day, 17 June. At a young age Dagur moved to Denmark with his parents but moved back to Ísafjörður at the age of 5. His mother is the former Icelandic cross-country skier and footballer Stella Hjaltadóttir. Just like his mother, Dagur played football along with skiing, playing for Vestri until the age of 18. In May 2017 Dagur graduated from Menntaskólinn á Ísafirði and moved to Östersund, Sweden to concentrate fully on skiing. In 2022, he was named Ísafjörður's athlete of the year.

Personal life
Dagur's wife is the Icelandic alpine ski racer Hólmfríður Dóra Friðgeirsdóttir.

References

1998 births
Living people
Dagur Benediktsson
Dagur Benediktsson
Cross-country skiers at the 2016 Winter Youth Olympics
Competitors at the 2023 Winter World University Games
21st-century Icelandic people